The twentieth Connecticut House of Representatives district elects one member of the Connecticut House of Representatives. Its current representative is Kate Farrar. The majority of the district consists of the Elmwood neighborhood of West Hartford.

List of representatives

Recent elections

References

20